Ray Heffernan (13 October 1935 – 19 November 2014) was an Australian cricketer. He played ten first-class matches for Tasmania between 1959 and 1968.

See also
 List of Tasmanian representative cricketers

References

External links
 

1935 births
2014 deaths
Australian cricketers
Tasmania cricketers
Cricketers from Hobart